

Schism
In 1964, after three years of existence, the 29-team conference ECAC Hockey was split in two. This was done partly due to its ponderous size but also because many of the programs in the conference were competing with differing levels of investment. The conference was divided between teams that, in essence, had indoor, artificial-ice arenas and those that didn't. A special provision was made for a few programs but by and large the 14 teams that were placed in ECAC 2 either couldn't or wouldn't fund their programs to a level where they could compete with the upper-echelon programs. The split resulted in the first official delineation of divisions in college ice hockey.

At the start there was no NCAA-sponsored tournament. Between the two extant conferences (ECAC 2 and MIAC) only ECAC 2 played a conference tournament, making the ECAC champion a de facto College Division champion (the MIAC would not hold a conference tournament until 1986).

Second Schism
Less than a decade after splitting from ECAC Hockey, ECAC 2 had swollen to more than 30 teams and a further, lower division was made (ECAC 3). ECAC 3 began its conference tournament immediately, however, as they were lower-tier than their parent conference, the ECAC 2 champion was still the de facto College Division champion.

In 1973 the NCAA reclassified its sporting divisions numerically. The first official Division II season was 1973–74 yet no second-tier national championship was held until 1978.

Tournament Play Begins
The NCAA began holding a lower-tier national tournament in 1978. While most of the teams that played as Division II ice hockey programs actually belonged to schools who were classified as Division III, due to the relatively small number of programs the NCAA did not require the teams to be D-II.

The NAIA had been holding an ice hockey tournament since 1968 which was used mostly by western schools. With the advent of the NCAA tournament many western programs began to gravitate back to the NCAA and eventually caused the discontinuation of the NAIA Championship.

In 1983 the NCAA created a championship for the Division III level and began requiring that teams participate only in the championships at their level. Due to the low numbers of teams at the Division II level, the D-II tournament survived for only one more season before being discontinued.

Tournament Returns
The NCAA agreed to restart the NCAA tournament due to increased interest from Division II programs. With no D-II conferences, the selection committee was left with only the overall records of teams to use when deciding the participants. Bemidji State participated in 6 of the first 7 championships, winning 4, but by 1998 most of the teams at the Division II level had left to join the top division, leaving the second tier with just a handful of programs and the tournament was, once again, discontinued.

Northeast 10
After the NCAA Division II tournament was discontinued in 1999, the few remaining D-II programs were barred from participating in conference tournaments in order for those conferences to retain automatic qualifiers. As a result, the eastern teams began holding a separate cross-conference tournament. This arrangement continued until the teams formally created the ice hockey division of the Northeast 10 in 2009. Because there were no Division II teams outside the conference there was no need for the NCAA to resurrect the National Championship leaving the tournament champion as the de facto Division II champion.

Conference Timeline

See also
List of NCAA Division II men's ice hockey champions

References

External links
USCHO.com

 
Seasons, men